The University of Yemen is a private university based in Yemen. It was established in 2008 and officially registered with the Ministry of Higher Education and Scientific Research under the Decree No. 1683. Academically, the university relies on the semester-based academic system and the academic programs contain various applied and theoretical disciplines under which a number of advanced research centers are affiliated.

Libraries  

University of Yemen has general library and digital library, making up the main nerve of the academic and learning disciplines of the university. The libraries provide students, faculties, employees and other members of the community with easy access to its location and holdings. Its collections include books, periodicals, manuscripts, government publications, academic theses, dissertations, press clippings, audio-visual and electronic media.

Community services  

Since its inception, University of Yemen has always given special attention to providing community service in the field of medical, education, health awareness services. Field visits in preventive  campaigns and organizing seminars on Thalassemia, nutrition and medicine and providing strategic planning and leadership skills are among the few examples of the university's community involvement.

Scientific research 

The University of Yemen recognizes the crucial role of the scientific research in developing human potential in Yemen.  For this importance,  the university established a special centre for scientific research which underlines the emphasis and focus on conducting and publishing studies, organizing conferences and seminars, and analysing statistics. The centre of scientific research established a Unit of Pharmaceutical Research and Studies, which underlines the emphasis on the effective contribution in the field of technical pharmaceutical research, studies and consultations to innovate, produce and develop medicines that match the requirements of community development in the pharmaceutical industry as one of the strategic industries through the university's scientific and academic contributions in this respect.

Sources 

1.	http://p.oasyemen.net/portal/universities.php

2.	http://www.aaru.edu.jo/Lists/ArabUniversities/Universities.aspx?Title=%D8%A7%D9%84%D9%8A%D9%85%D9%86

3.	http://www.aaru.edu.jo/Lists/ArabUniversities/Universities.aspx?Title=%D8%A7%D9%84%D9%8A%D9%85%D9%86

4.	https://www.4icu.org/reviews/17019.htm

5.	http://www.yemen-nic.info/sectors/education/#3

6.	http://www.yemenindex.net/77.html

7.	https://www.4icu.org/ye/

Sanaa
Science and Technology
Educational institutions established in 2008
2008 establishments in Yemen